Helmut Loos (born 5 July 1950)  is a German musicologist and emeritus scholar.

Life 
Born in Niederkrüchten, Loos studied music education from 1971 to 1974 and musicology, art history and philosophy from 1974 to 1980 at the University of Bonn. He received his doctorate in 1980 and was a research assistant at the Musicology Department of the University of Bonn from 1981 to 1989. In 1989 he completed his habilitation.

From 1989 to 1993 Loos was director of the Institute for German Music in the East in Bergisch Gladbach. In April 1993 he was appointed to the chair of historical musicology at the Technical University of Chemnitz.

His research focuses on the music of the 19th and 20th centuries, religious music and the music-cultural relations of Germany with Central and Eastern Europe.

Publications 
 Zur Klavierübertragung von Werken für und mit Orchester des 19. und 20. Jahrhunderts. Ein Beitrag zur Geschichte des Klavierauszuges (Schriften zur Musik, vol. 25), Munich/Salzburg 1983
 Weihnachten in der Musik. Grundzüge der Geschichte weihnachtlicher Musik 
 Robert Schumann. Werk und Leben (Vienna: Edition Steinbauer, 2010)
 Frédéric Chopin, as Robert Schumann and Felix Mendelssohn Bartholdy have seen him. Two Warsaw Lectures (Leipzig: Schröder, 2011)
 E-Musik – Kunstreligion der Moderne. Beethoven und andere Götter (Bärenreiter, Kassel 2017)

Further reading 
 Helmut Loos in Ludwig Finscher, The music in history and the present. (Second edition, personal part, volume 12).

References

External links
 Helmut Loos auf der Website der Universität Leipzig 

20th-century German musicologists
Academic staff of Leipzig University
1950 births
Living people
People from Viersen (district)